John Darby (d. 1704) was an English printer.

He was associated with the Whigs and printed many works by Whig authors. These included Andrew Marvell's An Account of the Growth of Popery and Arbitrary Government in 1677-1678 and during the rest of the Exclusion Crisis he helped keep Whig arguments in circulation. Other notable works that came off his press include Algernon Sidney's Discourses Concerning Government and Edmund Ludlow's Memoirs.

Notes

References
Blair Worden, Roundhead Reputations: The English Civil Wars and the Passions of Posterity (London: Penguin, 2001).

1704 deaths
English printers
Year of birth unknown